Cornelius Francis Molan (also known as Con Ryan; 15 October 1886 – 9 June 1969) was an Australian rules footballer who played with Geelong in the Victorian Football League (VFL).

Notes

External links 

1886 births
1969 deaths
Australian rules footballers from Victoria (Australia)
Geelong Football Club players
People from Colac, Victoria